The 2018–19 Luxembourg Division of Honour is the 58th season of second-tier association football in Luxembourg. The season began on 19 August 2018 and will end on 25 May 2019.

Teams
Etzella Ettelbruck and Rumelange were promoted to the Luxembourg National Division at the end of the previous season. They were replaced by Rodange 91 and Esch, who finished in the bottom two positions of the 2017–18 Luxembourg National Division. Norden 02, Grevenmacher, and Union 05 Kayl-Tétange were relegated at the end of the previous season and were replaced by Atert Bissen, Jeunesse Junglinster, and Koeppchen Wormeldange, who earned promotion from the Luxembourg 1. Division.

League table

Results
Each team plays every other team in the league, home-and-away, for a total of 26 matches each.

See also
2018–19 Luxembourg National Division
2018–19 Luxembourg Cup

References

External links

Football leagues in Luxembourg
Luxembourg
2